Ilias Kostis (born 27 February 2003) is a footballer who plays as a defender for Atlético Madrid B. Born in Greece, he is a Cyprus youth international.

Career

In 2019, Kostis joined the youth academy of Spanish La Liga side Atlético Madrid.

References

External links

2003 births

Living people
Association football defenders
Atlético Madrid B players
Cypriot expatriate footballers
Cypriot expatriate sportspeople in Spain
Cypriot footballers
Cyprus youth international footballers
Expatriate footballers in Spain
Footballers from Thessaloniki
Greek expatriate footballers
Greek expatriate sportspeople in Spain
Greek footballers
Greek people of Cypriot descent
Segunda Federación players